Frederick William Kolberg (November 13, 1900 – March 21, 1965) was an American welterweight boxer who competed in the early 1920s. He won a bronze medal in Boxing at the 1920 Summer Olympics, losing against Canadian boxer Bert Schneider in the semi-final.

References

External links
 
 

1900 births
1965 deaths
Welterweight boxers
Olympic bronze medalists for the United States in boxing
Boxers at the 1920 Summer Olympics
Place of birth missing
American male boxers
Medalists at the 1920 Summer Olympics